List of presidents of the Senate of Uruguay.

Below is a list of office-holders from 1830. From March 1, 1967 it is the Vice President of Uruguay who is the President of the Senate of Uruguay — although the office of Vice President of Uruguay was in abeyance from 1973 until 1985.

References

Uruguay
Presidents
Presidents of the Senate of Uruguay